The 2019 Kite Awards (Vietnamese: Giải Cánh diều 2019) is the 27th edition of Vietnam Cinema Association Awards, also the 18th edition since the award is officially named Kite. It honored the best in Vietnam film, television works of 2019. Affected by the COVID-19 pandemic, the award ceremony, which was originally planned to be held on March 15, 2020, then delayed to April 15, ended up being split into 2 small ceremonies at Hanoi on May 12 and Ho Chi Minh City on May 16.

This year, a total of 113 works participated in the award, including: 16 feature films, 13 TV drama series, 34 documentaries, 12 science films, 15 animated films, 17 short films and six film studies. The organizers do not announce the shortlist of nominees, but consider the prizes on all the above works and decide the winners.

The Happiness of a Mother won the most awards with six, including Golden Kite Award for Best Feature Film. In television, not unexpectedly, the hit show of the year Come Home, My Dear won the Golden Kite Award for Best Drama, also were the most awarded with two along with a promising acting award.

Winner and nominees 
Winners are listed first, highlighted in boldface.
Highlighted title indicates Golden Kite for the Best Film/Drama/Study winner(s).
Highlighted title indicates Silver Kite for the Second Best Film/Drama/Study winner(s).
Highlighted title indicates Film/Drama/Study(s) received the Certificate of Merit.
Other nominees

Feature film

Multiple wins 
The following films received multiple wins:

Television film

Multiple wins 
The following films received multiple wins:

Animated film

Multiple wins 
The following films received multiple wins:

Documentary film

Science film

Short film

Film critic/theory research

Controversy

Wrongly announced the Promising Actress 
A mistake of the organizers caused the announcement of the "Promising Actor in a Feature Film" award to be confused. The award originally belonged to child actress Ngân Chi, but before that, according to the press release, the award belonged to actress Oanh Kiều.

The winning of The Happiness of a Mother 
"The Happiness of a Mother" has never been considered a strong or brightest candidate among the 16 films competing for the award. The film was even boycotted by the audience before it was released because it was related to the controversy of the main cast. Therefore, the fact that the film won the top prize and won 6 other individual awards raises many doubts.

Director Huỳnh Đông was also surprised because he did not think his film would win so many awards, especially the Golden Kite Award for Feature Film. However, he denied "spending money to buy prizes" as rumors behind his back.

See also 
 21st Vietnam Film Festival
 39th National Television Festival
 2019 VTV Awards

References

External links
Thế Giới Điện Ảnh Online – Official Vietnam Cinema Association Magazine 

Vietnamese film awards
Kite Awards
Kite Awards
2019 in Vietnam
2019 in Vietnamese television
Impact of the COVID-19 pandemic on cinema
Impact of the COVID-19 pandemic on television